The priestly divisions or sacerdotal courses ( mishmar) are the groups into which Jewish priests were divided for the purposes of their service in the Temple in Jerusalem.

Role in the Temple
The Book of Chronicles refers to these priests as "descendants of Aaron." In the biblical traditions upon which the Chronicler drew, Aaron  had four sons: Nadab, Abihu, Eleazar and Ithamar. However, Nadab and Abihu died before Aaron and only Eleazar and Ithamar had sons. In Chronicles, one priest, Zadok, from Eleazar's descendants and another priest, Ahimelech, from Ithamar's descendants, were designated by King David to help create the various priestly work groups. Sixteen of Eleazar's descendants were selected to head priestly orders, while only eight of Ithamar's descendants were so chosen. The passage states that this was done because of the greater number of leaders among Eleazar's descendants. Lots were drawn to designate the order of ministering for the heads of the priestly orders when they entered the Temple.

Each order was responsible for ministering during a different week and Shabbat and were stationed at the Temple in Jerusalem. All of the orders were present during biblical festivals. Their duties involved offering the daily and holiday Temple sacrifices, and administering the Priestly Blessing to the people. The change between shifts took place on Shabbat at midday, with the outgoing shift performing the morning sacrifice, and the incoming shift the afternoon sacrifice.

According to 1 Chronicles 24, the divisions were originally formed during the reign of King David. However, many modern scholars treat these priestly courses either as a reflection of practices after the Babylonian captivity, or as an idealized portrait of how the Chronicler (writing in c. 350–300 BCE) thought temple administration ought to occur, with the reference to David being a method for the Chronicler to legitimize his views about the priesthood. At the end of the Second Temple period, it is clear that the divisions worked in the order specified.

Following the Temple's destruction
Following the Temple's destruction at the end of the First Jewish Revolt and the displacement to the Galilee of the bulk of the remaining Jewish population in Judea at the end of the Bar Kochva Revolt, Jewish tradition in the Talmud and poems from the period record that the descendants of each priestly watch established a separate residential seat in towns and villages of the Galilee, and maintained this residential pattern for at least several centuries in anticipation of the reconstruction of the Temple and reinstitution of the cycle of priestly courses. Specifically, this Kohanic settlement region stretched from the Beit Netofa Valley, through the Nazareth region to Arbel and the vicinity of Tiberias. In subsequent years, there was a custom of publicly recalling every Sabbath in the synagogues the courses of the priests, a practice that reinforced the prestige of the priests' lineage. Such mention evoked the hope of return to Jerusalem and reconstruction of the Temple.

A manuscript discovered in the Cairo Geniza, dated 1034 CE, records a customary formula recited weekly in the synagogues, during the Sabbath day: "Today is the holy Sabbath, the holy Sabbath unto the Lord; this day, which is the course? [Appropriate name] is the course. May the Merciful One return the course to its place soon, in our days. Amen." After which, they would recount the number of years that have passed since the destruction of Jerusalem, and conclude with the words: "May the Merciful One build his house and sanctuary, and let them say Amen."

Three stone inscriptions were discovered bearing the names of the priestly wards, their order and the name of the locality to which they had moved after the destruction of the Second Temple: In 1920, a stone inscription was found in Ashkelon showing a partial list of the priestly wards; in 1962 three small fragments of one Hebrew stone inscription bearing the partial names of places associated with the priestly courses (the rest of which had been reconstructed) were found in Caesarea Maritima, dated to the third-fourth centuries; in 1970 a stone inscription was found on a partially buried column in a mosque, in the Yemeni village of Bayt al-Ḥaḍir, showing ten names of the priestly wards and their respective towns and villages. The Yemeni inscription is the longest roster of names of this sort ever discovered, unto this day, although the seventh-century poet, Eleazar ben Killir, also wrote a liturgical poem detailing the 24-priestly wards and their places of residence. Historian and geographer, Samuel Klein (1886–1940), thinks that Killir's poem proves the prevalence of this custom of commemorating the courses in the synagogues of the Land of Israel.

The names legible on the stone column discovered by Walter W. Müller in 1970, in a mosque in Yemen, read as follows:

References 

Priesthood (Judaism)
Books of Chronicles
Jewish sacrificial law

it:Sacerdote (Ebraismo)#Le 24 divisioni kohaniche